The 2017 Big East Conference women's soccer tournament was the postseason women's soccer tournament for the Big East Conference held from October 29 through November 5, 2017. The five-match tournament took place at campus sites, with the higher seed hosting each game. The six-team single-elimination tournament consisted of three rounds based on seeding from regular season conference play. The defending champions were the Georgetown Hoyas and they successfully defended their title with a 3–0 victory over the Butler Bulldogs in the final. The conference tournament title was the second for the Georgetown women's soccer program, both of which have come under the direction of head coach Dave Nolan.

Bracket

Schedule

Quarterfinals

Semifinals

Final

Statistics

Goalscorers 

3 Goals
 Rachel Corboz - Georgetown

2 Goals
 Eli Beard - Marquette
 Caitlin Farrell - Georgetown

1 Goal
 Caitlyn Disarcina - Butler
 Madeline Frick - DePaul
 Julia Leonard - Butler
 Kelly Livingston - Georgetown
 Hannah McNulty - Providence
 Paige Monaghan  - Butler
 Taylor Pak - Georgetown
 Kylie Sprecher - Marquette

See also 
 2017 Big East Conference Men's Soccer Tournament

References 

 
Big East Conference Women's Soccer Tournament